"Famous" is the debut single by American singer Mason Ramsey, released on April 27, 2018 by Atlantic and Big Loud Records. Produced by Joey Moi, the song was written by Mason Ramsey, Tyler Hubbard, Corey Crowder, Sarah Buxton and Canaan Smith. It was serviced to country radio on April 30.

Composition
"Famous" blends traditional country with modern styles, which a Rolling Stone writer compared to Luke Bryan. Lyrically, the song narrates a pre-adolescent romance.

Chart performance
"Famous" entered at number 62 on the US Billboard Hot 100 and at number 4 on Hot Country Songs. It debuted with 10.8 million US streams and 19,000 sold in its first week.

Live performances
Ramsey performed the song at the Stagecoach Festival, along with his cover of "Lovesick Blues", during Florida Georgia Line's set.

Critical reception
Critical reaction to the song was positive, with praise for Ramsey's successful transition to serious country music.

Charts

Weekly charts

Year-end charts

Certifications

References

External links

2018 debut singles
2018 songs
Mason Ramsey songs
Atlantic Records singles
Big Loud singles
Song recordings produced by Joey Moi
Songs written by Canaan Smith
Songs written by Corey Crowder (songwriter)
Songs written by Sarah Buxton
Songs written by Tyler Hubbard